The forty-third edition of the Caribbean Series (Serie del Caribe) was held from February 1 through February 6 of  with the champion baseball teams of the Dominican Republic, Águilas Cibaeñas; Mexico, Naranjeros de Hermosillo; Puerto Rico, Cangrejeros de Santurce, and Venezuela, Cardenales de Lara. The format consisted of 12 games, each team facing the other teams twice, and the games were played at Estadio General Ángel Flores in Culiacán, Mexico.

Summary

Final standings

  * Had to attend family issues and was replaced by coach José López.

Individual leaders

All-Star team

Sources
Bjarkman, Peter. Diamonds around the Globe: The Encyclopedia of International Baseball. Greenwood. 
Serie del Caribe : History, Records and Statistics (Spanish)
Estadísticas Serie del Caribe 2001 (Spanish)

Caribbean
2001
February 2001 sports events in North America
International baseball competitions hosted by Mexico
2001 in Caribbean sport
2001 in Mexican sports
Caribbean Series